Vinylacetylene is the organic compound with the formula C4H4.  The colourless gas was once used in the polymer industry.  It is composed of both alkyne and alkene groups and is the simplest enyne.

Vinylacetylene is extremely dangerous because in high enough concentrations (typically > 30 mole percent, but pressure dependent) it can auto-detonate (explode without air being present) especially at elevated pressures, such as those seen in chemical plants processing C4 hydrocarbons. An example of such an explosion occurred at a Union Carbide plant in Texas City in 1969.

Synthesis 
Vinylacetylene was first synthesized by Hofmann elimination of the related quaternary ammonium salt:
[(CH3)3NCH2CH=CHCH2N(CH3)3]I2  →  2 [(CH3)3NH]I  +  HC≡C-CH=CH2
It is usually synthesized by dehydrohalogenation of 1,3-dichloro-2-butene. It also arises via the dimerization of acetylene or dehydrogenation of 1,3-butadiene.

Application 
At one time, chloroprene (2-chloro-1,3-butadiene), an industrially important monomer,  was produced via the intermediacy of vinyl acetylene.  In this process, acetylene is dimerized to give vinyl acetylene, which is then combined with hydrogen chloride to give 4-chloro-1,2-butadiene via 1,4-addition. This allene derivative which, in the presence of cuprous chloride, rearranges to 2-chloro-1,3-butadiene:
H2C=CH-C≡CH  +  HCl   →   H2ClC-CH=C=CH2
H2ClC-CH=C=CH2   →   H2C=CH-CCl=CH2

References 

Conjugated enynes
Vinyl compounds
Ethynyl compounds